Archery at the 1992 Summer Paralympics consisted of seven events.

Medal table

Participating nations

Medal summary

See also
Archery at the 1992 Summer Olympics

References 

 

1992 Summer Paralympics events
1992
Paralympics